Stillwater or still water  may refer to:

Still water, water that is not carbonated

Places

Settlements in the United States
Stillwater, Minnesota
Stillwater County, Montana
Stillwater igneous complex
Stillwater, Nevada
Stillwater, New Jersey
Stillwater, New York
Stillwater (village), New York
Stillwater, Ohio
Stillwater, Oklahoma, the largest city with this name
Stillwater, Ossining
Stillwater, Pennsylvania
Stillwater, Washington
Stillwater Township (disambiguation)

Settlements in other countries
Stillwater, Edmonton, Alberta, Canada
Stillwater, Nova Scotia (disambiguation), several places in Canada
Stillwater, Auckland, North Island of New Zealand
Stillwater, West Coast, South Island of New Zealand

Arts and entertainment
 Stillwater (band), a 1970s music group
 Stillwater (fictional band), from the 2000 film Almost Famous
 Stillwater, a fictional panda in the 2005 book Zen Shorts
Stillwater (TV series), an animated adaptation
 Stillwater (film), a 2021 American crime drama
 Still Water (sculpture), a 2011 bronze of a horse's head at Marble Arch, London, England
 "Still Water (Love)" and "Still Water (Peace)", 1970 songs by Four Tops

Businesses and organizations 
 Still Water (University of Maine), a former laboratory at the University of Maine, U.S.
 Stillwater Mill, a former textile factory in Smithfield, Rhode Island, U.S.
 Stillwater Mining Company, a palladium and platinum mining company
 Minnesota Correctional Facility – Stillwater, an American prison

See also

Stillwater River (disambiguation)
Still Waters (disambiguation)
Still waters run deep (disambiguation)
Stilwater, a fictional city in video game Saints Row
Stillwaterite, a palladium arsenide mineral